Guantanamo's Child is a 2015 Canadian documentary film. Directed by Patrick Reed and Michelle Shephard based on Shephard's 2009 book Guantanamo's Child: The Untold Story of Omar Khadr, the film profiles Omar Khadr, a Canadian citizen whose conviction on disputed war crimes charges and incarceration at the Guantanamo Bay detention camp has been a prominent political issue in Canada.

Synopsis

The documentary features the story of Omar Khadr, in which he was captured in 2002 by Americans in Afghanistan and was charged with war crimes. The film takes an in-depth look at how Khadr at 15 years old became the center of one of the first American war crimes trial since the 1940s through Khadr's own perspective. Omar Khadr for the first time was given the opportunity to speak for himself on camera. Khadr pleaded guilty to five war crimes in October 2010 for a plea deal which gave him a chance to possibly return to Canada and an eight-year sentence. Omar Khadr spent a decade at Guantanamo,"Guantanamo’s Child: Omar Khadr features unprecedented access and exclusive interviews with Khadr during his first few days of freedom in Edmonton, where he was released on bail on May 7, 2015". The film is in part based on Michelle Shepard’s book Guantanamo's Child: The Untold Story of Omar Khadr; the documentary follows through the timeline between Khadr's childhood and his time at Guantanamo till his current life of freedom.

Production

The film was produced by White Pine Pictures, in association with Al Jazeera and the Canadian Broadcasting Corporation. This documentary is an expanded version of a television program that aired on CBC in May 2015 called Omar Khadr: Out of the Shadows. A version of the film aired on Al Jazeera English in June 2015. It had its world premiere at the 2015 Toronto International Film Festival.  At the 2015 Calgary International Film Festival, the film won the Audience Choice Award for Best Documentary Feature. In December, the film was announced as part of TIFF's annual Canada's Top Ten screening series of the so-called ten best Canadian feature films of the year.

Reception

Guantanamo’s Child: Omar Khadr was nominated for an Emmy  at the 37th Annual News & Documentary Emmy Awards. The film was nominated in the Outstanding Coverage of Current News Story—Long Form category, along with PBS Frontline projects, Secrets, Politics and Torture and Inside Assad’s Syria.   The documentary has also received the  Best Direction in a Documentary Program award at the Academy of Canadian Cinema.

References

External links 
 
 
 Interview with Michelle Shephard and Patrick Reed (Vice.com)
 Guantanamo's Child at Al Jazeera English

2015 films
2015 documentary films
2010s Canadian films
2010s English-language films
Canadian documentary television films
CBC Television original films
Documentary films about child soldiers
Documentary films about lawyers
Documentary films about the War in Afghanistan (2001–2021)
Donald Brittain Award winning shows

English-language Canadian films
Films scored by Mark Korven
Guantanamo Bay detention camp